Abdoldjavad Falaturi (1926–1996) was a German scholar of Iranian origin.

He studied Islam (theology, sharia, ...) in Iran, up to the highest possible level, before going to Germany where he studied philosophy (up to PhD). He has also written several other official publications (together with Udo Tworuschka) for education in Germany on Islamic theology (initially "Der Islam im Unterricht. Beiträge zur interkulturellen Erziehung in Europa", in: Beilage zu den Studien zur Internationalen Schulbuchforschung, Braunschweig : Georg-Eckert-Institut, 1992.)

He focussed on the confusion between cultural habits and religious rules. Among others, he writes that it is incorrect to state that the chador is a religious obligation.

Bibliography 
 Islam in Religious Education Textbooks in Europe, 1995
  Co-authored with Elizabeth Petuchowski and Jakob Josef Petuchowski 
 
 Elementary Persian Grammar, 1967
 
 An unpublished treatise of Miskawaih on Justice or Risāla fī Māhiyat al-'adl li Miskawaih., 1968 (German and English Edition) 
 Islam in the classroom: Contributions to intercultural education in Europe. German Edition, 1991 (Co-authored with Udo Tworuschka)
 History of Religion in Public (Cologne publications on the history of religion; Vol. 1). German Edition
 Muslim thoughts for Teachers and textbooks authors 
 Qişşat al-īmān baina al-falsafa wa al-'ilm wa al-qur'ān., 1965 (German edition)
 Zur Interpretation der Kantischen Ethik im Lichte der Achtung. Mit einem Anhang: Vorarbeit zu Studien zu einem allgemeinen Kantwörterbuch / Abdoldjavad Falaturi, 1965 (Thesis (doctoral)--Rheinische Friedrich-Wilhelms-Universität Bonn, 1926.)
  
 Analysis of the Catholic religion books on the subject of Islam (Islam in the school books of the Federal Republic of Germany), 1988 (Co-Author) German Edition
 
 Beitrage zu islamischem Rechtsdenken, 2006 doi:10.2307/1570994
  (German Edition), (Contributing author)
 
 Die Umdeutung der griechischen Philosophie durch das islamische Denken (German Edition), 2018.

References

External links
 Abdoldjavad Falaturi's List of Publications
 Abdoldjavad Falaturi, WorldCat
 Author: Abdoldjavad Falaturi's books
 Abdoldjavad Falaturi PP's detailed Biography

1926 births
1996 deaths
Iranian writers
Iranian writers in German
German-language writers
Islamic philosophers
German Shia Muslims
German male writers
Faculty of Theology and Islamic Studies of the University of Tehran alumni
Burials at Takht-e Foulad